The Morning Show, also known as Morning Wars in Australia and Indonesia, is an American drama television series starring Jennifer Aniston, Reese Witherspoon, and Steve Carell, that premiered on Apple TV+ on November 1, 2019. The series is inspired by Brian Stelter's 2013 book Top of the Morning: Inside the Cutthroat World of Morning TV. The show examines the characters and culture behind a network broadcast morning news program. After allegations of sexual misconduct, the male coanchor of the program is forced off the show. Aspects of the #MeToo movement are examined from multiple perspectives, as more and more information comes out regarding said misconduct.

The second season premiered on September 17, 2021. The series was renewed for a third season in January 2022.

Premise
Alex Levy anchors The Morning Show (TMS), a popular morning news program broadcast from Manhattan on the UBA network, which has excellent viewership ratings and is perceived to have changed the face of American television.

In the first season, after her on-air partner of 15 years, Mitch Kessler, is fired amidst a sexual misconduct scandal, Alex fights to retain her job as top news anchor while sparking a rivalry with Bradley Jackson, a haphazard field reporter whose series of impulsive decisions brings her into a new world of television journalism.

In the second season, the network CEO attempts to convince Alex to return as the COVID-19 pandemic gradually engulfs the United States and the show itself, whilst Bradley deals with an identity crisis.

Cast and characters

Main

 Jennifer Aniston as Alexandra "Alex" Levy, co-host of UBA's TMS
 Reese Witherspoon as Bradley Jackson, TMS co-host
 Billy Crudup as Cory Ellison, CEO of UBA
 Mark Duplass as Charlie "Chip" Black, executive producer of TMS
 Gugu Mbatha-Raw as Hannah Shoenfeld, talent booker for TMS (season 1)
 Néstor Carbonell as Yanko Flores, the meteorologist of TMS
 Karen Pittman as Mia Jordan, a producer at TMS
 Bel Powley as Claire Conway, a production assistant at TMS (season 1; guest season 2)
 Desean Terry as Daniel Henderson, co-host of the weekend edition of TMS
 Jack Davenport as Jason Craig, Alex's ex-husband (season 1)
 Steve Carell as Mitch Kessler, the recently fired co-host of The Morning Show (seasons 1–2)
 Greta Lee as Stella Bak, President of News in UBA (season 2)
 Ruairi O'Connor as Ty Fitzgerald, social media expert at UBA (season 2)
 Julianna Margulies as Laura Peterson, a news anchor at UBA (season 2)
 Jon Hamm as Paul Marks (season 3)
 Nicole Beharie as Christine Hunter, a new anchor who joins UBA (season 3)

Recurring

 Victoria Tate as Rena Robinson, Chip's assistant 
 Shari Belafonte as Julia 
 Joe Marinelli as Donny Spagnoli 
 Eli Bildner as Joel Rapkin 
 Tom Irwin as Fred Micklen, UBA's president 
 Janina Gavankar as Alison Namazi, co-host of the weekend edition of TMS 
 Hannah Leder as Isabella 
 Amber Friendly as Layla Bell 
 Michelle Meredith as Lindsey Sherman 
 Joe Pacheco as Bart Daley 
 Marcia Gay Harden as Maggie Brener, a reporter and journalist 
 Augustus Prew as Sean 
 Andrea Bendewald as Valérie 
 Katherine Ko as Dhillon Reece-Smit (season 1) 
 Ian Gomez as Greg (season 1) 
 Joe Tippett as Hal Jackson 
 Oona Roche as Lizzy Craig, Alex and Jason's daughter 
 Markus Flanagan as Gerard 
 David Magidoff as Nicky Brooks (season 1) 
 Embeth Davidtz as Paige Kessler 
 Kate Vernon as Geneva Micklen (season 1) 
 Mindy Kaling as Audra, a rival morning news anchor 
 Roman Mitichyan as Sam Rudo (season 1) 
 Mark Harelik as Richard 
 Martin Short as Dick Lundry 
 Adina Porter as Sarah Gravele (season 1) 
 Brett Butler as Sandy Jackson (season 1) 
 Philip Anthony-Rodriguez as Gabriel (season 1) 

 Valeria Golino as Paola Lambruschini (season 2) 
 Theo Iyer as Kyle (season 2) 
 Tara Karsian as Gayle Berman (season 2) 
 Holland Taylor as Cybil Richards (season 2)  
 Hasan Minhaj as Eric Nomani, Bradley's new co-host (season 2) 
 Patrick Bristow as Gordon (season 2) 
 Katie Aselton as Madeleine, Chip's love-interest  (season 2) 
 Jack Conley as Earl (season 2) 
 Erika Ringor as Mandy Schaeffer (season 2)   

 Tig Notaro as Amanda Robinson (season 3)

Guest

Season 1

 Fred Melamed as Neal Altman 
 Ahna O'Reilly as Ashley Brown 
 Natalia Warner as Cecily 
 Andrew Leeds as Alan 
 John Marshall Jones as Noah 
 Zuri Hall as herself 
 Kelly Clarkson as herself 
 Kelly Sullivan as Vicki Manderly 
 David Morse as Mr. Jackson 
 Julian Morris as Andrew 
 Cheyenne Jackson as himself 
 Robert Cicchini as Robert 
 Mike O'Malley as Tim Eavers 
 Romy Rosemont as Sheila Lutkin 
 Brian Bowen Smith as photographer 
 Paul Guilfoyle as Reid 
 Ethan Cohn as Jared 
 Dana Davis as Christine 
 Maria Sharapova as herself 
 Hayes MacArthur as Marlon Tate

Season 2

 Will Arnett as Doug Klassen 
 Zak Lee Guarnaccia as Professore Viola 
 Dave Foley as Peter Bullard 
 Kathy Najimy as Sylvia Portman 
 Molly McNearney as Aria Bloom 
 James Urbaniak as Backstage Manager 
 David Bowe as Clyde Canter 
 Patrick Fabian as Jeff 
 Foo Fighters as Themselves 
 David Paymer as Hannah's Father 
 Brian Stelter as Carl Richardson 
 Meredith Scott Lynn as Linda

Episodes

Season 1 (2019)

Season 2 (2021)

Production

Development
On November 8, 2017, it was announced that Apple had given the production a series order consisting of two seasons of ten episodes apiece. The series was set to be executive produced by Jennifer Aniston, Reese Witherspoon, Jay Carson, and Michael Ellenberg. Carson was expected to act as a writer and showrunner for the series as well. Production companies involved with the series were slated to consist of Media Res, Echo Films, and Hello Sunshine. On April 4, 2018, it was announced that Carson had departed the production over creative differences. He was replaced as executive producer and showrunner by Kerry Ehrin. On July 11, 2018, it was reported that Mimi Leder would serve as a director and executive producer for the series. On October 23, 2018, it was reported that Kristin Hahn and Lauren Levy Neustadter would serve as additional executive producers for the series.

On June 22, 2020, Aniston revealed in a Variety interview with Lisa Kudrow that the show's development began prior to the Me Too movement, but was ultimately reworked to include and partially focus on it.

The show cost $15 million per episode, with Aniston and Witherspoon each earning $2 million per episode, not including producing fees and ownership points. On January 10, 2022, Apple renewed the series for a third season.

Casting
Alongside the initial series announcement, it was confirmed that Aniston and Witherspoon had been cast in the series' lead roles. In October 2018, it was announced that Steve Carell, Gugu Mbatha-Raw, Billy Crudup, Néstor Carbonell and Mark Duplass had been cast in series regular roles. On November 7, 2018, it was reported that Bel Powley, Karen Pittman, and Desean Terry had joined the main cast of the series.

On October 9, 2020, Greta Lee and Ruairi O'Connor officially joined the second season as regular characters. On November 13, 2020, Hasan Minhaj was also announced as a new cast member. On December 3, 2020, Julianna Margulies announced she joined the second season of the series. In August 2022, it was announced that Jon Hamm and Nicole Beharie had joined the main cast for the third season, with Tig Notaro joining in a recurring role.

Filming
Principal photography for the first season commenced on October 31, 2018, at the James Oviatt Building in Los Angeles. Filming continued in Los Angeles until filming started in New York City on May 9, 2019. Production on the first season also concluded that May, after seven months of filming.

Production on the second season began on February 24, 2020. On March 12, 2020, Apple TV+ halted production on the series due to the COVID-19 pandemic. The second season resumed filming on October 19, 2020. Between February and March 2021, Steve Carell, Jennifer Aniston, Mark Duplass, and Hannah Leder were spotted in Los Angeles filming the second season. On May 18, 2021, filming for season two concluded.

Production on the third season began on August 16, 2022. Filming for the third season wrapped up on February 14, 2023.

Release 
After the Apple Special Event of March 25, 2019, Witherspoon announced on Instagram that the series would premiere in the fall of 2019.  It premiered on Apple TV+ on November 1, 2019. In January 2021, Apple announced that the second season would premiere in 2021. The second season premiered on September 17, 2021.

During the Apple Special Event, a teaser trailer was released with footage from the series as well as footage from other original series set to premiere on Apple TV+. Furthermore, Aniston, Witherspoon, and Carell were at the event to promote the series. On August 12, 2019, Apple released a first look trailer for the series. It was also revealed that the series would be titled Morning Wars in Australia, in order to distinguish the series from the Australian morning talk show of the same name.

Reception

Critical response 

On Rotten Tomatoes it received an overall score of 64%, and an overall score of 61 on Metacritic.

For first season of The Morning Show, the review aggregation website Rotten Tomatoes reported a 61% approval rating, based on 106 reviews, with an average rating of 5.9/10. The website's critical consensus reads, "Flashy, but somewhat frivolous, The Morning Show often feels more like a vanity project than the hard-hitting drama it aspires to be—but there is pleasure to be had in watching Jennifer Aniston and Reese Witherspoon give it their all." Metacritic, which uses a weighted average, assigned a score of 61 out of 100 based on reviews from 37 critics, indicating "generally favorable reviews".

The second season of the series received a 67% from Rotten Tomatoes based on 51 reviews. The website's critical consensus reads, "The Morning Show'''s second season has a slew of stupendous performances - but too many characters attempting to address too many hot-button issues makes it hard to know what any of them are actually trying to say." At Metacritic, the website gave the second season a 60 out of 100, based on 25 reviews.

Richard Roeper of the Chicago Sun-Times gave a positive review and wrote: "The Morning Show doesn't have the cinematic gravitas of the Showtime series The Loudest Voice or the Aaron Sorkin poetry of HBO's The Newsroom. It's more along the lines of the solid but underachieving Sports Night TV series from the late 1990s."
 Audience viewership 
According to TV analytics provider TVision, The Morning Show has been viewed by panel members 5.03 times as much as the average Apple TV+ original series or shows TVision has measured since Apple TV+ launched in November 2019. The series became the second most watched Apple TV+ series after Ted Lasso''.

Awards and nominations

References

External links
  – official site
 

2019 American television series debuts
2010s American workplace drama television series
2020s American workplace drama television series
2010s American satirical television series
2020s American satirical television series
2010s American LGBT-related drama television series
2020s American LGBT-related drama television series
English-language television shows
Television series about journalism
Television series about television
Television shows about the COVID-19 pandemic
Apple TV+ original programming
Television productions suspended due to the COVID-19 pandemic
Television shows based on non-fiction books